Stanley Adams (born Stanley Abramowitz; April 7, 1915 – April 27, 1977) was an American actor and screenwriter. He appeared in many television series and films, notably Breakfast at Tiffany's (1961), Lilies of the Field (1963), and in TV series from Gunsmoke to the Star Trek episode "The Trouble with Tribbles" in which he played a salesman selling tribbles.

Early life
Adams was born in New York City.  He had his first film role playing the bartender in the movie version of Death of a Salesman (1951). He played another barkeep in The Gene Krupa Story and a safecracker in Roger Corman's High School Big Shot (1959).

Career
Adams had a lengthy career as a character actor, often playing comic, pompous characters.

Adams played Otis Campbell's brother on an episode of The Andy Griffith Show; the character berated Otis for being the town drunk but turned out to be an alcoholic himself. His 1959 portrayal of Chicago gangster/gambler Nick Popolous in Mr. Lucky ("That Stands For Pool") is especially good as he deftly shifts from bumpkin to killer multiple times.

He appeared in an episode of The Tab Hunter Show in 1961. His other roles on TV shows include roles in six episodes of Wagon Train and three episode of Gunsmoke. as political boss Frank Templeton in the final episode of McHale's Navy (1962–1966) "Wally for Congress." He played a realtor on The Dick Van Dyke Show episode "Your Home Sweet Home Is My Home Sweet Home". He had two roles in the syndicated western series Death Valley Days in the episodes "The Holy Terror" (1963) and "The Lady and the Sourdough" (1966). He appeared as King Kaliwani in the final episode of Gilligan's Island, and as Captain Courageous in two episodes of the 1960s Batman TV series ("Catwoman Goes to College"/"Batman Displays his Knowledge"). He also played notorious pool shark "Sure Shot" Wilson on series The Odd Couple.

In genre television he appeared on The Twilight Zone as a time-traveling scientist—opposite Buster Keaton—in "Once Upon a Time" and as a bartender ("Mr Garrity and the Graves") and as Ilya Klarpe on The Addams Family (1964). In science fiction television circles he is known primarily for two roles, as "Tybo" the anthropomorphic carrot in the penultimate episode of Lost in Space, "The Great Vegetable Rebellion" (1968), and for playing Cyrano Jones in "The Trouble with Tribbles" (1967) episode of Star Trek. He reprised (as a voice actor) Cyrano Jones in the Star Trek: The Animated Series episode "More Tribbles, More Troubles" and archival footage of Adams as Jones was later featured in the Star Trek: Deep Space Nine episode "Trials and Tribble-ations" (1996). He also co-wrote an episode for Star Trek's final season, "The Mark of Gideon".

Adams also had a lengthy theatrical motion picture career. In the 1962 theatrical film adaptation of Rod Serling's teleplay Requiem for a Heavyweight he played the supporting role of Perelli, a sleazy promoter who offers a washed-up boxer a degrading job as a professional wrestler. He played the Chicano café owner in Lilies of the Field and portrayed Rutherford "Rusty" Trawler, "the 9th richest man in America under 50" in the Audrey Hepburn film Breakfast at Tiffany's. He played Bernie the foulmouthed caller in the 1974 action/adventure movie Act of Vengeance.

Death

Adams committed suicide on April 27, 1977, at the age of 62. He was reportedly depressed due to chronic pain from a back injury. He was cremated at Rosedale Cemetery, Los Angeles. His ashes were scattered in the Pacific Ocean. He left behind an ex-wife, a son and a daughter.

Selected filmography

The Atomic Kid (1954) - Wildcat Hooper
Hell's Horizon (1955) - Dixie
The Fighting Chance (1955) - Piggie (uncredited)
Hell on Frisco Bay (1956) - Hammy
Inside Detroit (1956) - Harry (uncredited)
The Killer Is Loose (1956) - Honor Farm Guard (uncredited)
The Bold and the Brave (1956) - Master Sergeant
Somebody Up There Likes Me (1956) - Romolo's Attorney (uncredited)
Calling Homicide (1956) - Peter von Elda (uncredited)
Trooper Hook (1957) - Heathcliff
Valerie (1957) - Dr. Jackson
Black Patch (1957) - Professor Dudley - Drummer
Hell Bound (1957) - Herbert Fay Jr.
Hell Ship Mutiny (1957) - Roxy
I Married a Woman (1958) - Cabbie (uncredited)
Saddle the Wind (1958) - Joe - Bartender (uncredited)
High School Big Shot (1959) - Harry March
North by Northwest (1959) - Lieutenant Harding (uncredited)
The Gene Krupa Story (1959) - Bar Owner (uncredited)
The Gazebo (1959) - Dan Shelby (voice, uncredited)
One Foot in Hell (1960) - Pete (uncredited)
The Rat Race (1960) - Cab Driver (uncredited)
Studs Lonigan (1960) - Gangster (uncredited)
North to Alaska (1960) - Breezy
The Wizard of Baghdad (1960) - Warden Kvetch
The Young Savages (1961) - Police Lt. Hardy (uncredited)
Pirates of Tortuga (1961) - Captain Montbars
Breakfast at Tiffany's (1961) - Rusty Trawler
The Errand Boy (1961) - Grumpy
The Outsider (1961) - Noomie
13 West Street (1962) - Finney
Have Gun Will Travel (1962) - Caleb Musgrove 
Requiem for a Heavyweight (1962) - Perelli 
Critic's Choice (1963) - Bartender
Lilies of the Field (1963) - Juan
Wild and Wonderful (1964) - Mayor of Man La Loquet
Looking for Love (1964) - Employment Service Official (uncredited)
A House Is Not a Home (1964) - Harry
Fate Is the Hunter (1964) - Bernie (uncredited)
Ship of Fools (1965) - Professor Hutten
Your Home Sweet Home Is My Home (1965) - Jack Parkly
When the Boys Meet the Girls (1965) - Lank
Nevada Smith (1966) - Storekeeper
Thunder Alley (1967) - Mac Lunsford
Double Trouble (1967) - Captain Roach
Massacre Harbor (1968) - El Gamil (this consists of three episodes of the TV series The Rat Patrol - 'The Last Harbor Raid' parts I, II & III - released as a film)
The Grasshopper (1970) - Buddy Miller
Move (1970) - New Tenant
The Seven Minutes (1971) - Irwin Blair
Machismo: 40 Graves for 40 Guns (1971) - Granger
Everything You Always Wanted to Know About Sex* (*But Were Afraid to Ask) (1972) - Stomach Operator
Another Nice Mess (1972) - President of Persia
California Country (1973) - Grandpa Boomer
The Clones (1973) - Carl Swafford
Act of Vengeance  (1974) - Bernie / Foul Mouth
Dixie Dynamite (1976) - Dade McCrutchen
Woman in the Rain (1976)
The Great Gundown (1977) - Buck (final film role)

References

External links

 
 

1915 births
1977 suicides
20th-century American male actors
American male film actors
American male television actors
American television writers
American male television writers
Male actors from New York City
Suicides by firearm in California
Writers from New York City
Male actors from Los Angeles
20th-century American male writers
Screenwriters from New York (state)
Screenwriters from California
20th-century American screenwriters
1977 deaths